Switzerland is an unincorporated community in Jasper County, South Carolina, United States. The community is part of the Hilton Head Island-Bluffton-Beaufort, SC Metropolitan Statistical Area. The community's name comes from Swiss natives who originally came to South Carolina and had settled in the nearby Purrysburg settlement on the banks of the Savannah River, near present-day Hardeeville. Due to competition from Savannah and health issues, many of the settlers moved further inland and created the hamlet.  In the past century, the population of the hamlet has dwindled in comparison to growth in Ridgeland and Hardeeville.

Switzerland is located just south of Ridgeland along U.S. Highways 17 and 278. It is accessible from Interstate 95 via exit 18.

References

Unincorporated communities in Jasper County, South Carolina
Unincorporated communities in South Carolina
Hilton Head Island–Beaufort micropolitan area
Swiss-American culture in South Carolina